The 2020–21 ABA League Second Division was the 4th season of the ABA Second Division with 14 teams from Bosnia and Herzegovina, Croatia, Montenegro, North Macedonia, Serbia, and Slovenia participating in it. The season has started on 9 November 2020.

The season was the first to be played after the previous season was abandoned due to the COVID-19 pandemic. In accordance with the COVID-19 situation, it has been determined that the season will be played in new competition format and new calendar.

Teams 
A total of 14 teams contested the league, including two representatives from all six ABA League countries. In cases where a club from an individual country does not apply for the 2020–21 season, the empty spot will be filled by awarding wild cards. The first two teams from the previous season, Borac Čačak and Split, were awarded wild cards to compete in the 2020–21 ABA League First Division. On 29 June 2020, the ABA League Assembly confirmed the final list of the 2020–21 season participants.

Team allocation 

The labels in the parentheses show how each team qualified for the place of its starting round:

 1st, 2nd, 3rd, 4th, etc.: National League position
 WC: Wild card
 Abd-: League positions of abandoned season due to the COVID-19 pandemic as determined by the leagues

In early June 2020, seven clubs contested for four wild cards. Later that month, Serbian club Novi Pazar withdrew its bid following failure to meet financial requirements. On 29 June, the ABA League Assembly announced four wild cards recipients, including Sloboda Tuzla (Bosnia and Herzegovina), Studentski centar (Montenegro), Podgorica Bemax (Montenegro) and Mladost Zemun (Serbia). Teams Borac Banja Luka (Bosnia and Herzegovina) and Gostivar (North Macedonia) did not receive the wild card.

Reportedly, Borac Banja Luka received an invitation on 6 October 2020, after Sloboda Tuzla withdrawal. On 13 October, the League officially confirmed Borac Banja Luka as the final participant in the 2020–21 season.

Personnel and sponsorship

Coaching changes

Venues
The Regular season was divided in four tournaments. The first tournament was held in Čajetina, Serbia. The second tournament was held in Banja Luka, Bosnia and Herzegovina. The third tournament was held in Sarajevo, Bosnia and Herzegovina while the fourth was held in Čajetina. The playoffs will be held in Podgorica, Montenegro.

Regular season
The Regular season was split in four tournaments with two tournaments featuring four rounds and the last one five rounds. It will be played in a round-robin system and after 13 rounds there will be Playoffs with eight teams and Play-out with four teams.

The first tournament of four rounds took place between 9 November and 18 November 2020 in Čajetina, Serbia. The Croatian club Gorica missed the first tournament due to records of several COVID-19 positive players within their team. The second tournament of three rounds took place between 18 January and 24 January 2021 in Banja Luka, Bosnia and Herzegovina. The Macedonian club Rabotnički missed the second tournament due to COVID-19 pandemic situation and the restrictions.

The third tournament of three rounds was held from 1–7 March 2021 in Sarajevo, Bosnia and Herzegovina.

League table

Positions by round

Results

Playoffs

Based on the results and position of the clubs in the standings after the regular season, Playoffs will take place with teams from 1st to 8th position. The Quarterfinals will be played in knockout pairs 1–8, 2–7, 3–6, 4–5. The winners of the Quarterfinals will qualify to the Semifinals and the winners of the Semifinals will play the Final.

The playoff tournament will be held in Podgorica, Montenegro between 19 April and 6 May 2021.

Playout
Based on the results and position of the clubs in the standings after the regular season, Playout would take place with teams from 11th to 14th position. The Playout would be played in knockout pairs 11–14, 12–13. The defeated teams would play for the final 13th and 14th places in the standings. On 3 April 2021, the playout tournament was canceled due to the COVID-19 pandemic.

Four clubs, Lovćen 1947, Rabotnički, Sutjeska, and Helios Suns, were qualified for the tournament.

Promotion playoffs 
The 13th placed team of the First Division season and the runners-up of the Second Division season will play in the Qualifiers for a spot in the next First Division season.

Results 

|}

MVP List

MVP of the Round

Source: ABA 2 League

See also 
 List of current ABA League Second Division team rosters
 2020–21 ABA League First Division

2020–21 domestic competitions
  2020–21 Basketball Championship of Bosnia and Herzegovina
  2020–21 HT Premijer liga
  2020–21 Prva A liga
  2020–21 Macedonian First League
  2020–21 Basketball League of Serbia
  2020–21 Slovenian Basketball League

References

External links 
 Official website
 ABA League at Eurobasket.com

ABA Second Division seasons
2020–21 in European second tier basketball leagues
2020–21 in Serbian basketball
2020–21 in Slovenian basketball
2020–21 in Croatian basketball
2020–21 in Bosnia and Herzegovina basketball
2020–21 in Montenegrin basketball
2020–21 in North Macedonia basketball
November 2020 sports events in Europe
January 2021 sports events in Europe
March 2021 sports events in Europe
International basketball competitions hosted by Bosnia and Herzegovina
International basketball competitions hosted by Serbia
Sports competitions in Sarajevo